Amy Jensen (born 31 July 1978) is a former professional tennis player from Australia.

Biography
Originally from Brisbane, Jensen had a successful career in American college tennis playing for UC Berkeley. From 1998 to 2000 she won three successive NCAA doubles titles, partnering Amanda Augustus in the first two, then Claire Curran for the third.

As a professional player she had a top 200 ranking in doubles and won eight ITF titles. She featured in the main draw of the women's doubles at both the Australian Open and US Open during her career. At the 2000 US Open, she and partner Claire Curran won the first set of their opening round match against Martina Hingis and Mary Pierce.

Jensen has held several coaches positions in college tennis. She is currently the head coach for UC Santa Cruz.

ITF finals

Doubles (8–4)

References

External links
 
 

1978 births
Living people
Australian female tennis players
Australian tennis coaches
Tennis players from Brisbane
Australian expatriate sportspeople in the United States
California Golden Bears women's tennis players
UC Santa Cruz Banana Slugs coaches
College tennis coaches in the United States